Burshag is a rural locality (a selo) and the administrative centre of Burshagsky Selsoviet, Agulsky District, Republic of Dagestan, Russia. The population was 653 as of 2010.

Geography 
Burshag is located on the Koshanapu River, 29 km northeast of Tpig (the district's administrative centre) by road. Khudig is the nearest rural locality.

References 

Rural localities in Agulsky District